Prince Renmer B. Caperal (born June 12, 1993) is a Filipino basketball player for the NorthPort Batang Pier of the PBA. He was drafted 17th overall by the GlobalPort Batang Pier in the 2014 PBA draft.

College
Caperal attended Arellano University, where he went to the finals against San Beda college in 2014, his senior year.

Professional career

GlobalPort Batang Pier (2014–2015)

Caperal was selected by the GlobalPort Batang Pier as the 17th overall pick in the 2014 PBA Draft.

Barako Bull Energy / Phoenix Fuel Masters (2015–2017)

On 2015, he was traded by the GlobalPort Batang Pier to the Barangay Ginebra San Miguel in exchange for fellow big man Dorian Peña and then he along with Mac Baracael, were shipped to the Barako Bull Energy.

Mahindra Floodbuster / Kia Picanto (2017–2018)

In 2017, Caperal was traded to the Phoenix Fuel Masters, but was immediately dealt to the Mahindra Floodbuster in exchange for rookie Joseph Eriobu.

Barangay Ginebra San Miguel (2018–2022)
In February 2018, Caperal signed with the Barangay Ginebra San Miguel. Caperal had been traded to Ginebra in 2015 but was immediately traded.

NorthPort Batang Pier (2022–present)
On September 20, 2022, Caperal, along with Arvin Tolentino and a 2022 first-round pick, was traded to the NorthPort Batang Pier for Jamie Malonzo.

PBA career statistics

As of the end of 2022–23 season

Season-by-season averages

|-
| align=left | 
| align=left | GlobalPort
| 16 || 4.5 || .379 || .500 || .667 || .8 || .1 || .0 || .1 || 1.7
|-
| align=left rowspan=2| 
| align=left | Barako Bull
| rowspan=2|19 || rowspan=2|6.3 || rowspan=2|.422 || rowspan=2|.333 || rowspan=2|.875 || rowspan=2|1.4 || rowspan=2|.1 || rowspan=2|.1 || rowspan=2|.1 || rowspan=2|2.5
|-
| align=left | Phoenix
|-
| align=left rowspan=2| 
| align=left | Phoenix
| rowspan=2|27 || rowspan=2|13.2 || rowspan=2|.381 || rowspan=2|.125 || rowspan=2|.625 || rowspan=2|3.6 || rowspan=2|.3 || rowspan=2|.1 || rowspan=2|.4 || rowspan=2|3.6
|-
| align=left | Mahindra / Kia
|-
| align=left rowspan=2| 
| align=left | Kia
| rowspan=2|35 || rowspan=2|11.3 || rowspan=2|.477 || rowspan=2|.538 || rowspan=2|.714 || rowspan=2|2.7 || rowspan=2|.6 || rowspan=2|.1 || rowspan=2|.1 || rowspan=2|4.1
|-
| align=left | Barangay Ginebra
|-
| align=left | 
| align=left | Barangay Ginebra
| 34 || 7.0 || .286 || .167 || .800 || 1.5 || .2 || .1 || .0 || 1.2
|-
| align=left | 
| align=left | Barangay Ginebra
| 22 || 21.1 || .431 || .420 || .733 || 3.9 || .8 || .0 || .2 || 7.8
|-
| align=left | 
| align=left | Barangay Ginebra
| 26 || 10.8 || .333 || .216 || .667 || 2.5 || .5 || .1 || .0 || 3.7
|-
| align=left rowspan=2| 
| align=left | Barangay Ginebra
| rowspan=2|34 || rowspan=2|7.2 || rowspan=2|.326 || rowspan=2|.154 || rowspan=2|.889 || rowspan=2|1.0 || rowspan=2|.2 || rowspan=2|.1 || rowspan=2|.1 || rowspan=2|2.1
|-
| align=left | NorthPort
|-class=sortbottom
| align=center colspan=2 | Career
| 213 || 10.2 || .389 || .293 || .727 || 2.2 || .4 || .1 || .1 || 3.3

References

1993 births
Living people
Arellano Chiefs basketball players
Barako Bull Energy players
Barangay Ginebra San Miguel players
Basketball players from Quezon City
Centers (basketball)
Filipino men's basketball players
NorthPort Batang Pier draft picks
NorthPort Batang Pier players
Phoenix Super LPG Fuel Masters players
Power forwards (basketball)
Terrafirma Dyip players